Louis Williams (born 1889; date of death unknown) was an English footballer who played for Bradford City, Bristol Rovers, Port Vale and Stoke.

Career
Williams played for North Staffs Nomads, before joining league club Stoke in 1907. He played 33 games for the "Potters" in the 1907–08 season, and scored once in a 1–0 win over Stockport County at the Victoria Ground on 8 February, only to find the club resigning from the league due to financial difficulties. In 1908 he moved on to Second Division champions Bradford City and later played in the Southern League for Bristol Rovers before moving back to Staffordshire in June 1912 to join Port Vale. Williams failed to gain a regular place in a team aiming to gain re-election to the Football League and was duly released at the end of the 1912–13 season.

Career statistics
Source:

References

1889 births
Year of death missing
People from Longton, Staffordshire
Footballers from Stoke-on-Trent
English footballers
Association football defenders
Stoke City F.C. players
Bradford City A.F.C. players
Bristol Rovers F.C. players
Port Vale F.C. players
English Football League players
Southern Football League players